Abel Colley Tavern is a historic home that also served as an inn and tavern located at Menallen Township, Fayette County, Pennsylvania.  It was built about 1835, and is a -story, 5-bay, brick dwelling with a -story rear kitchen ell.  It sits on a sandstone foundation and is in the Greek Revival style.  It was built as a stop for 19th-century travelers on the National Road.

It was added to the National Register of Historic Places in 1995.

References

Houses on the National Register of Historic Places in Pennsylvania
Houses completed in 1835
Greek Revival houses in Pennsylvania
Houses in Fayette County, Pennsylvania
National Register of Historic Places in Fayette County, Pennsylvania